KCOV-LP (95.7 FM) is a radio station broadcasting a religious format. Licensed to Gillette, Wyoming, United States, the station serves the Gillette area.  The station is currently owned by First Presbyterian Church.

References

External links
 

COV-LP
COV-LP
Radio stations established in 2002
2002 establishments in Wyoming